Jack Leonard may refer to:
 Jack Leonard (footballer) (1876 – after 1899), English footballer
 Jack Leonard (hurler) (1873–1938), Irish hurler 
 Jack E. Leonard (1910–1973), American comedian and actor